Percy Jackson and the Olympians is an upcoming American fantasy television series for the streaming service Disney+, based on the novel series of the same name by Rick Riordan. The series is produced by Disney Branded Television, 20th Television, and the Gotham Group.

Walker Scobell stars as Percy Jackson, alongside Leah Sava Jeffries and Aryan Simhadri. Development on the series began by May 2020, following a pitch by Riordan to the Walt Disney Company. Jonathan E. Steinberg and Dan Shotz were announced as showrunners in July 2021, with James Bobin hired to direct the first episode in October. Scobell was cast in the lead role in January 2022, with Jeffries and Simhadri joining the cast in May. By September, Anders Engström and Jet Wilkinson were also set to direct multiple episodes of the series. Filming began in June 2022 in Vancouver, British Columbia and concluded in February 2023, with additional cast members revealed throughout 2022 and 2023.

Percy Jackson and the Olympians is scheduled to premiere in 2024, with the first season consisting of eight episodes.

Premise 
12-year-old demigod Percy Jackson is accused by the Greek god Zeus of stealing his thunderbolt.

Cast

Main 
 Walker Scobell as Percy Jackson, a young demigod.
 Leah Sava Jeffries as Annabeth Chase, a daughter of Athena who has been training at Camp Half-Blood for five years.
 Aryan Simhadri as Grover Underwood, Percy's best friend and a satyr who is disguised as a 12-year-old boy.

Recurring 
 Virginia Kull as Sally Jackson, Percy's selfless mother.
 Glynn Turman as Chiron / Mr. Brunner, a centaur disguised as Percy's Latin teacher.
 Jason Mantzoukas as Dionysus / Mr. D, the head of Camp Half-Blood.
 Megan Mullally as Alecto / Ms. Dodds, Percy's stern mathematics teacher who serves the god Hades as one of the three Furies.
 Timm Sharp as Gabe Ugliano, Sally's husband and Percy's stepfather.
 Dior Goodjohn as Clarisse La Rue, a strong-willed daughter of Ares who bullies Percy.
 Charlie Bushnell as Luke Castellan, a swordsman who is the counselor of the Hermes cabin.
 Adam Copeland as Ares, the arrogant and daring god of war.

Guest 
 Olivea Morton as Nancy Bobofit, a blunt teacher's pet who relishes tormenting Percy.
 Suzanne Cryer as Echidna, the menacing mother of monsters.
 Jessica Parker Kennedy as Medusa, a gorgon who lives in solitude.
 Lin-Manuel Miranda as Hermes, the messenger of the gods.
 Jay Duplass as Hades, the god of the underworld.
 Timothy Omundson as Hephaestus, the god of blacksmiths.
 Lance Reddick as Zeus, the ferocious god of the sky whose thunderbolt has been stolen. This will be Reddick's final television appearance, following his death in March 2023.
 Toby Stephens as Poseidon, Percy's father and god of the sea who is stubborn and impulsive.
Additionally, Jason Gray-Stanford has been cast in an undisclosed role.

Episodes 
The pilot episode was written by Rick Riordan and Jonathan E. Steinberg, with James Bobin set to direct. Anders Engström will direct the third and fourth episodes while Jet Wilkinson will direct the fifth and sixth.

Production

Development 
In November 2018, Rick Riordan stated that he believed he would have no creative control over a Disney reboot of the Percy Jackson novel series if it were to happen, much like his experience with the film series with 20th Century Fox. In December 2019, Riordan pitched an adaptation of the novels to the Walt Disney Company, which had acquired Fox in March of that year. By May 2020, a Disney+ series based on Percy Jackson was in the works, with the first season set to adapt the first book in the series, The Lightning Thief. Riordan revealed in March 2021 that searches for the series' directors and cast was underway, with James Bobin was announced as the pilot episode's director in October. Jonathan E. Steinberg and Dan Shotz were also announced as showrunners in July.

The series was greenlit in January 2022, with Disney Branded Television, 20th Television, and the Gotham Group producing the project. Steinberg, Shotz, Bobin, and Riordan were announced as executive producers alongside Rebecca Riordan, Bert Salke, Monica Owusu-Breen, Jim Rowe, Anders Engström, Jet Wilkinson, Ellen Goldsmith-Vein, Jeremy Bell, and D. J. Goldberg. At the D23 Expo in September, Anders Engström and Jet Wilkinson were revealed to be executive producing the series as well. The same month, Riordan revealed that Engström would direct the third and fourth episodes while Wilkinson would direct the fifth and sixth.

Writing 
Drafts of the pilot episode were being reviewed by March 2021. In April 2021, it was announced that Steinberg would serve as co-writer and executive producer of the pilot alongside Riordan. The same day, Monica Owusu-Breen, Daphne Olive, Stewart Strandberg, Zoë Neary, Joe Tracz, and Xavier Stiles joined as writers. Each season of the series will adapt one installment of the book series, with the first season being an adaptation of The Lightning Thief. In addition to writing the pilot, Riordan and co-showrunner Steinberg created a series bible for the show, as well as planning the plot for the first season and creating ideas for potential future seasons.

Casting 
Preliminary casting began in April 2021. In January 2022, Walker Scobell was cast in the lead role as Percy Jackson, with this being announced in April. The next month, it was announced that Leah Sava Jeffries and Aryan Simhadri would respectively portray Annabeth Chase and Grover Underwood, two close friends of Percy. Jeffries' casting received online backlash due to Annabeth not being depicted as Black in the novels, which Riordan condemned as racism. In June, Virginia Kull, Glynn Turman, Jason Mantzoukas, Megan Mullally, and Timm Sharp were announced to be appearing in recurring capacities as Sally Jackson, Chiron, Dionysus, Alecto, and Gabe Ugliano, respectively. The same month, Dior Goodjohn and Charlie Bushnell joined the cast in recurring roles as Clarisse La Rue and Luke Castellan, respectively, while Olivea Morton was announced to portray Nancy Bobofit in a guest role. Adam Copeland was cast in the recurring role of Ares in October, while Suzanne Cryer and Jessica Parker Kennedy were cast in the guest roles of Echidna and Medusa, respectively. In November 2022, Lin-Manuel Miranda, Jay Duplass, and Timothy Omundson were announced to guest-star as Hermes, Hades, and Hephaestus, respectively; as were Lance Reddick and Toby Stephens in January 2023, announced to portray Zeus and Poseidon, respectively. Jason Gray-Stanford was cast in an undisclosed role in March 2023.

Filming 
Principal photography began on June 2, 2022 in Vancouver, British Columbia, under the working title Mink Golden, and concluded on February 2, 2023. The series utilized an LED stage powered by Industrial Light & Magic's StageCraft visual effects technology.

Marketing 
A teaser for the series was revealed during the D23 Expo in September 2022. Rotem Rusak of Nerdist highlighted how the teaser featured the opening lines of The Lightning Thief, while Kendall Myers of Collider noted the teaser's dark tone.

Release 
The series will be released on Disney+ in 2024, with the first season consisting of eight episodes. In July 2022, Riordan stated that the series would likely be released around early 2024, a timeframe which was confirmed in September.

References

External links 
 

2020s American drama television series
2020s American television series debuts
Disney+ original programming
English-language television shows
Percy Jackson & the Olympians
Productions using StageCraft
Television series by 20th Century Fox Television
Television shows based on American novels
Television shows filmed in Vancouver
Upcoming drama television series